Šindelová is a municipality and village in Sokolov District in the Karlovy Vary Region of the Czech Republic. It has about 300 inhabitants.

Administrative parts
Villages of Krásná Lípa and Obora are administrative parts of Šindelová.

References

Villages in Sokolov District